WHGB (1400 AM) is a commercial radio station in  Harrisburg, Pennsylvania. The station is owned by Cumulus Media and broadcasts a sports radio format.  Most programming is supplied by the CBS Sports Radio Network, in which parent company Cumulus has a financial interest.

Programming is also heard on two FM translators, W237DE at 95.3 MHz and W243BR at 96.5 MHz.

History
On May 28, 1945, the station first signed on, owned by the Harrisburg Broadcasting Company.  It was given the call sign WHGB and broadcast at 250 watts, as a network affiliate of ABC. In 1963, it became WFEC (for its owner Florida East Coast Broadcasting) featuring a Top 40 format.  By 1977, it tried several unsuccessful formats, including country music, disco and urban contemporary.

In 1982, owned by Great Scott Broadcasting, it returned to Top 40, adopting Mike Joseph's Hot Hits format in response to that format's national success. Although WFEC featured the jingles and other high-energy basics of the Hot Hits format, it was not consulted by Joseph himself. During the Hot Hits era, the station was known as Fire 14.

By the last quarter of 1984, the station changed its call sign back to WHGB. For much of the 1980s it featured Al Ham's "The Music of Your Life" adult standards format along with substantial local sports play by play.
 
On October 31, 1990, the station changed its call sign to WNNK as "Wink 1400", a sister station to 104.1 WNNK-FM. On August 27, 1993, WNNK 1400 changed its call sign to WTCY and its format switched to Urban Adult Contemporary, branded as "1400 The Touch," using a satellite-delivered syndicated service known as "The Touch."

On July 24, 2008, WTCY began simulcasting "The Touch" programming on an FM translator, 95.3 W237DE.

On August 20, 2008, WTCY changed back to its original call letters, WHGB, which it had used in the 1940s, 1950s and 1960s and again from 1984 until 1990. The station changed format to sports radio as an ESPN Radio affiliate, while the Urban AC format was moved to the HD2 subchannel of sister station WNNK-FM, which allowed W237DE to continue to simulcast "The Touch." On September 1, 2011, the translator's simulcast was switched back to WHGB, bringing ESPN Radio to FM in Harrisburg, and ending "The Touch."

On January 2, 2013, the station switched to the CBS Sports Radio network.

On March 2, 2015 WHGB changed its format from sports to country, branded as "95.3 Nash Icon."  Nash Icon is heard on dozens of Cumulus-owned stations, featuring country artists who first achieved fame in the 1980s, 90s and early 2000s.  Then, about a year later, the sports format returned, once again using CBS Sports Radio as its primary programming source.

Translators
WHGB programming is broadcast on the following translators:

Previous logos

References

External links
Official website

HGB
Radio stations established in 1963
1963 establishments in Pennsylvania
Cumulus Media radio stations